Beitar Tel Aviv Bat Yam F.C. is an Israeli football club which represents Tel Aviv and Bat Yam. It plays in the Liga Alef, the second level of Israeli football. Home matches are played at the Ramla Municipal Stadium.

History
Beitar Shimshon Tel Aviv was formed in 2000 by a merger of Beitar Tel Aviv and Shimshon Tel Aviv. Both clubs were in Liga Artzit at the time of the merger, with the new club assuming a place in the league. In 2006 the club moved to Bnei Yehuda's Hatikva Neighborhood Stadium.

In 2008–09, the club finished sixth in Liga Artzit, and due to league restructuring, were promoted to Liga Leumit, the second tier.

In 2011, the club had his second merger, this time with Ironi Ramla, due to it, Shimshon retired from the union making the team changed its name to Beitar Tel Aviv Ramla.

On 22 May 2019, Ramla withdrew from the merge and the club merged with Maccabi Ironi Bat Yam, due to it, the club changed his name to Beitar Tel Aviv Bat Yam.

After the conclusion of the 2019-20 season, 12 players from Beitar Tel Aviv Bat Yam's roster went on to play in the Israel Premier League.

Current squad
 As of 7 February 2023

Former notable managers

 Rafi Cohen (born 1965)

Symbols from the past

External links
 Team info on The Israel Football Association website

References

Sport in Ramla
 
 
Football clubs in Israel
Football clubs in Tel Aviv
Tel Aviv Bat Yam
Association football clubs established in 2000
2000 establishments in Israel